Mesolestes is a genus of beetles in the family Carabidae, containing the following species:

 Mesolestes accentifer (Raffray, 1873) 
 Mesolestes affinis (Peringuey, 1896)  
 Mesolestes ambiguus Mateu, 1980 
 Mesolestes ankaratrae (Mateu, 1975) 
 Mesolestes apterus Mateu, 1962 
 Mesolestes basilewskyi Mateu, 1962 
 Mesolestes bilineatus (Basilewsky, 1949) 
 Mesolestes brincki (Mateu, 1965) 
 Mesolestes brittoni (Mateu, 1956) 
 Mesolestes brunneipes (Mateu, 1980) 
 Mesolestes caecus (Antoine, 1941) 
 Mesolestes descarpentriesi (Mateu, 1975) 
 Mesolestes flavescens (Chaudoir, 1876) 
 Mesolestes flavosignatus (Boheman, 1848) 
 Mesolestes fraterculus (Chaudoir, 1876) 
 Mesolestes fusculus (Peringuey, 1896) 
 Mesolestes fuscus Mateu, 1956 
 Mesolestes humeralis (Jeannel, 1949) 
 Mesolestes innoshimae (Habu, 1974)  
 Mesolestes katanganus (Mateu, 1967) 
 Mesolestes kilimanus (Alluaud, 1917)  
 Mesolestes laevis (Mateu, 1980) 
 Mesolestes leleupi (Mateu, 1962) 
 Mesolestes machadoi Mateu, 1965 
 Mesolestes maculatus Mateu, 1960 
 Mesolestes madecassus (Mateu, 1960) 
 Mesolestes meridionalis Mateu, 1965 
 Mesolestes mirus (Mateu, 1980) 
 Mesolestes nigrocephalus Mateu, 1962 
 Mesolestes orinodromus (Alluaud, 1907) 
 Mesolestes orophilus (Mateu, 1960) 
 Mesolestes promontorii (Peringuey, 1899)  
 Mesolestes pueli (Antoine, 1923)  
 Mesolestes quadriguttatus Mateu, 1979 
 Mesolestes relictus (Jeanne, 1985) 
 Mesolestes rufus (Mateu, 1967) 
 Mesolestes scapularis (Dejean, 1830) 
 Mesolestes sellatus (Motschulsky, 1855) 
 Mesolestes senegalensis Mateu, 1969 
 Mesolestes sermeti (Mateu & Colas, 1954) 
 Mesolestes sicardi (Bedel, 1918) 
 Mesolestes silvaticus (Mateu, 1967) 
 Mesolestes striatus Mateu, 1972 
 Mesolestes virgatus (Mateu, 1984) 
 Mesolestes vittatus (Mateu, 1979)

References

Lebiinae